Mamee-Double Decker (M) Sdn Bhd (doing business as MAMEE) is a Malaysian based company with interests in the manufacturing, marketing and distribution of snack foods, beverages, and other products, that exports to around 100 countries with the slogan "A World of Good Taste". It is very popular in areas like Singapore, Brunei, Indonesia, Southern Thailand and Australia. As of 2015, the company headquarters is in the Air Keroh Industrial Estate in Malacca, Malaysia and it has an office in Subang, Selangor.

History
The company was founded by Datuk Pang Chin Hin (冯振轩) in 1971, who also serves as the company's Executive Chairman. Mamee was incorporated on 3 August 1991 and was listed on the Kuala Lumpur Stock Exchange's main board on 18 March 1992. Mamee-Double Decker was delisted from Bursa Malaysia on 9 January 2012.

Manchester United signed a sponsorship deal with Mamee Double-Decker from 2011 to 2014.

References

External links
 
 Company Overview of Mamee-Double Decker M Bhd, bloomberg.com
 Mamee-Double Decker (M) Berhad (MYX: 5282), bursamalaysia.com

Privately held companies of Malaysia
Malaysian brands
Malaysian cuisine
Food and drink companies of Malaysia
Food and drink companies established in 1971
1971 establishments in Malaysia
Companies formerly listed on Bursa Malaysia